Borgenicht is a surname. Notable people with the surname include:

 Grace Borgenicht Brandt (1915–2001), American art dealer
 Jack Borgenicht (1911–2005), American industrialist and land use preservationist
 Nancy Borgenicht (born 1942), American actress
 Ruth Borgenicht (born 1967), American ceramic artist
 Miriam Borgenicht (1915−1992), American mystery novelist